Bismillah Khan (born Qumaruddin Khan, 21 March 1916 – 21 August 2006), often referred to by the title Ustad, was an Indian musician credited with popularizing the shehnai, a reeded woodwind instrument. He played it with such expressive virtuosity that he became a leading Hindustani classical music artist. His name was indelibly linked with the woodwind instrument. While the shehnai had long held importance as a folk instrument played primarily schooled in traditional ceremonies, Khan is credited with elevating its status and bringing it to the concert stage.

Khan was a devout Muslim but performed at both Hindu and Muslim ceremonies and was considered a symbol of religious harmony. His fame was such that he was selected to perform for the ceremony at Delhi’s historic Red Fort as the Indian flag unfurled at the hour of India’s independence on August 15, 1947. His music was played on television every Independence Day. He turned down invitations to perform in other countries before 1966, when the Indian government insisted that he play at the Edinburgh International Festival. This gained him a following in the West, and he continued to appear in Europe and North America thereafter.

In 2001, Bismillah Khan was awarded the Bharat Ratna , India’s highest civilian honour, and the country observed a national day of mourning following his death in 2006. He became the third classical musician of India after M. S. Subbalakshmi and Ravi Shankar to be awarded the Bharat Ratna.

Personal life

Bismillah Khan was born on 21 March 1916 into a family of traditional Muslim musicians at the town of Dumraon, British India, as the second son of Paigambar Bux Khan and Mitthanbai. His father was a court musician employed in the court of Maharaja Keshav Prasad Singh of Dumraon Estate in Bihar. His two grandfathers Ustad Salar Hussain Khan and  Rasool Bux Khan were also musicians in the Dumraon palace. He was named Qamruddin at birth, to rhyme with his elder brother's name Shamsuddin. Upon seeing the new born, his grandfather Rasool Baksh Khan, also a shehnai player, is said to have exclaimed "Bismillah", or "In the name of Allah", and thereafter he came to be known by this name.

At the age of six, he moved to Varanasi in the state of Uttar Pradesh, to be apprenticed to his maternal uncle, Ali Bux 'Vilayatu' Khan, a shehnai player attached to the Kashi Vishwanath Temple. At the age of 14, Bismillah accompanied his uncle to the Allahabad music conference. 

Bismillah Khan began his career by playing at various stage shows. He got his first major break in 1937, when he played at a concert at All India Music Conference in Calcutta. This performance brought Shehnai into the limelight and was hugely appreciated by music lovers. He then went on to play in many countries including Afghanistan, USA, Canada, Bangladesh, Iran, Iraq, West Africa, Japan, Hong Kong and in various parts of Europe. During his illustrious career he played in many prominent events throughout the world. Some of the events that he played in include World Exposition in Montreal, Cannes Art Festival and Osaka Trade Fair.

Students
Khan attributed his skill to the blessings of nath (Shiva), and believed that there was little that he could teach his disciples. Khan seldom accepted students. He thought that if he would be able to share his knowledge it wouldn't be useful as it would only give his students a little knowledge. Some of his disciples and followers include S. Ballesh, and Krishna Ballesh. as well as Khan's own sons, Nazim Hussain and Nayyar Hussain.

Death
On 17 march 2006, Bismillah Khan's health deteriorated and he was admitted to the Heritage Hospital, Varanasi for treatment. Khan's last wish – to perform at India Gate, could not be fulfilled. He wanted to pay tributes to the martyrs.
He waited in vain till his last rites. He died of cardiac arrest on 21 August 2006.

The Government of India declared a day of national mourning on his death. His body along with a Shehnai was buried at Fatemaan burial ground of old Varanasi under a neem tree with a 21-gun salute from the Indian Army.

Legacy

Sangeet Natak Akademi, New Delhi, instituted the Ustad Bismillah Khan Yuva Puraskar in 2007, in his honour. It is given to young artists in the field of music, theatre and dance. The Government of Bihar has proposed setting up of a museum, a town hall-cum-library and installation of a life-size statue at his birthplace in Dumraon.

Bismillah Khan was commemorated on his 102nd birth anniversary by Search Engine Google which showed a special doodle on its Indian home page for him on 21 March 2018.

In the documentary film, Eric Clapton: Life in 12 Bars, Clapton cites Bismillah Khan as an influence and how he tried to use his guitar to imitate the music of Khan's woodwind instrument.

In popular culture
Khan had a brief association with films in India. He played the shehnai for Rajkumar's role of Appanna in the Vijay's Kannada-language film Sanaadi Appanna which became a blockbuster. He acted in Jalsaghar by Satyajit Ray and provided sound of shehnai in Vijay Bhatt's Goonj Uthi Shehnai(1959).

Noted director Goutam Ghose directed Sange Meel Se Mulaqat (1989), an Indian documentary film about the life of Khan.

Awards and recognitions

Awards
Bharat Ratna  (2001)
Swathi Sangeetha Puraskaram (1998), Government of Kerala
T Choudayya National Award (1995), Government of Karnataka
Fellow of Sangeet Natak Akademi (1994)
Tahar Mausique from Republic of Iran (1992)
Padma Vibhushan (1980)
Padma Bhushan (1968)
Padma Shri (1961)
Sangeet Natak Akademi Award (1956)
Tansen Award by Govt. of Madhya Pradesh.
Three medals in All India Music Conference, Calcutta (1937)

Recognitions
Bismillah Khan had honorary doctorates from: 
Banaras Hindu University, Varanasi
Visva Bharati University, Santiniketan

Others include
 Was invited by then Prime Minister of India Pandit Jawaharlal Nehru to play shehnai on the first Independence Day (15 August 1947) in Delhi's Red Fort.
 Participated in World Exposition in Montreal
 Participated in Cannes Art Festival
 Participated in Osaka Trade Fair
 India Post issued commemorative postage stamps of ₹5.00 denomination on 21 August 2008
 On his 102nd birthday, Google honored Bismillah Khan with a Google doodle.

Selective discography
Albums
 Sanaadi Appanna – Played shehnai for Rajkumar's role in the movie.
 Goonj Uthi Shehnai (1959) – shehnai recitals throughout the movie for Rajendra Kumar's role.
 Maestro's Choice (February 1994)
 Megh Malhar, Vol. 4 (the other piece in the album is by Kishori Amonkar) (September 1994)
 Live at the Queen Elizabeth Hall (September 2000)
 Live in London, Vol. 2 (September 2000)
Immortal Series

Contributing artist
 The Rough Guide to the Music of India and Pakistan (1996, World Music Network)

References

 Life history of Bismillah Khan, the Legend of Varanasi
 Meeting a Milestone: Ustad Bismillah Khan. A documentary by Goutam Ghose, 1989

Biographies
 Bismillah Khan: the shehnai maestro, by Neeraja Poddar. Rupa & Co., 2018. .
 Monograph on Shehnai maestro Bismillah Khan, by Amar Jyoti, Shivnath Jha, Alok Jain, Anjali Sinha. Pub. Neena Jha & Shivnath Jha, 2019. .
 Bismillah Khan and Banaras: the seat of shehnai, by Rita Ganguly. Siddhi Books, 1994.
 Shahnai Vadak Ustad Bismillah Khan, by Murli Manohar Shrivguguiastava. Prabhat Prakashan, 2009. .
 Bismillah Khan: The Maestro from Benaras, by Juhi Sinha. Niyogi Books, 2011. .
 Naubatkhane Mein Ibadat, by Yatindra Mishra. Chapter in NCERT's Hindi textbook for 10th Standard.
 In the NCERT English Textbook for 9th Grade he is credited largely in the chapter "The Sound Of Music".

External links

National mourning for Ustad Bismillah Khan. Times of India..
 Event. indianstage.in.
 Homage to Ustad Bismillah Khan. elinepa.org.

1914 births
2006 deaths
People from Buxar district
Shehnai players
Hindustani instrumentalists
Musicians from Bihar
Musicians from Varanasi
Indian Shia Muslims
Recipients of the Padma Bhushan in arts
Recipients of the Padma Shri in arts
Recipients of the Padma Vibhushan in arts
Recipients of the Sangeet Natak Akademi Award
Recipients of the Bharat Ratna
20th-century Indian musicians
Indian people of Pashtun descent
Recipients of the Sangeet Natak Akademi Fellowship